George Whitfield Crabb (February 22, 1804 – August 15, 1846) was a U.S. Representative from Alabama.

Born in Botetourt County, Virginia, Crabb attended the public schools.
He moved to Tuscaloosa, Alabama.

Crabb was elected assistant secretary of the State senate and comptroller of public accounts in 1829.
He served in the Florida Indian War of 1836 and was lieutenant colonel of the Alabama Volunteers.
He served as member of the State house of representatives in 1836 and 1837.
He served in the State senate in 1837 and 1838.
Major general of militia.

Crabb was elected as a Whig to the Twenty-fifth Congress to fill the vacancy caused by the death of Joab Lawler.
He was reelected to the Twenty-sixth Congress and served from September 4, 1838, to March 4, 1841.
He was an unsuccessful candidate for reelection to the Twenty-seventh Congress.
He was appointed judge of the county court of Mobile in 1846.
He died in Philadelphia, Pennsylvania, August 15, 1846.
He was interred in Greenwood Cemetery, Tuscaloosa, Alabama.

References

External links

1804 births
1846 deaths
American militia generals
Whig Party members of the United States House of Representatives from Alabama
19th-century American politicians